Tom Glazebrook was an Australian rugby league player. A lock, he played seven matches for the Eastern Suburbs in 1918, scoring one try against Newtown.

References

Year of birth missing
Year of death missing
Australian rugby league players
Sydney Roosters players
Rugby league locks